A duty (from "due" meaning "that which is owing"; , past participle of devoir; , whence "debt") is a commitment or expectation to perform some action in general or if certain circumstances arise.  A duty may arise from a system of ethics or morality, especially in an honor culture. Many duties are created by law, sometimes including a codified punishment or liability for non-performance. Performing one's duty may require some sacrifice of self-interest.

Cicero, an early Roman philosopher who discusses duty in his work “On Duty", suggests that duties can come from four different sources:
 as a result of being a human
 as a result of one's particular place in life (one's family, one's country, one's job)
 as a result of one's character
 as a result of one's own moral expectations for oneself

The specific duties imposed by law or culture vary considerably, depending on jurisdiction, religion, and social normalities.

Civic duty

Duty is also often perceived as something owed to one's country (patriotism), or to one's homeland or community. Civic duties could include:
 Obey the law
 Pay taxes
 Provide for a common defense, should the need arise
 Enroll to vote, and vote at all elections and referendums (unless there is a reasonable excuse such as a religious objection, being overseas, or illness on polling day)
 Serve on a jury, if called upon
 Go to the aid of victims of accidents and street crime and testifying as a witness later in court
 Report contagious illnesses or pestilence to public-health authorities
 Volunteer for public services (e.g. life-saving drills)
 Donate blood periodically or when needed
 Give time to voice advice on a relevant field of expertise, benefits, workplace improvements and on how it is conducted or run
 Duty of revolution against an unjust government

Duties of employment
Specific obligations arise in the services performed by a minister of a church, by a soldier, or by any employee or servant.

Examples:
 Dereliction of duty is an offense in U.S. military law
 Duty to protect, in medicine
 In loco parentis, for schools
 Professional responsibility for lawyers

Legal duties
Examples of legal duties include:
 Duty of care
 Duty of candour
 Duty to defend and duty to settle, in insurance
 Duty to rescue
 Duty to retreat
 Duty to report a felony
 Duty to vote (in countries with mandatory voting)
 Duty to warn
 Fiduciary duties
 Duty to care for children as legal guardian (opposite of child neglect)
 Special duties created by a contract
 In loco parentis (duty like a parent to child towards nonhuman entities, such as animals, river, environment, etc. e.g. by treating them as legal person.

Filial duty

In most cultures, children are expected to take on duties in relation to their families. This may take the form of behaving in such a way that upholds the family's honor in the eyes of the community, entering into arranged marriages that benefit the family's status, or caring for ailing relatives. This family-oriented sense of duty is a particularly central aspect to the teachings of Confucius, and is known as xiao, or filial piety. As such, the duties of filial piety have played an enormous role in the lives of people in eastern Asia for centuries. For example, the painting Lady Feng and the Bear, from ancient China, depicts the heroic act of a consort of the emperor placing herself between her husband and a rampaging bear. This is meant to be taken as an example of admirable filial behavior. Filial piety is considered so important that in some cases, it outweighs other cardinal virtues: In a more modern example, "concerns with filial piety of the same general sort that motivate women to engage in factory work in Korea, Japan, Taiwan, Malaysia, Singapore, Indonesia, and elsewhere in Asia are commonly cited by Thai prostitutes as one of their primary rationales for working in the skin trade". The importance of filial piety can be expressed in this quote from the Analects of Confucius: "Yu Tzu said, 'It is rare for a man whose character is such that he is good as a son and obedient as a young man to have the inclination to transgress against his superiors; it is unheard of for one who has no such inclination to be inclined to start a rebellion. The gentleman devotes his efforts to the roots, for once the roots are established, the Way will grow there from. Being good as a son and obedient as a young man is, perhaps, the root of a man's character'".

In various cultures
Duty varies between different cultures and continents. Duty in Asia and Latin America is commonly more heavily weighted than in Western culture. According to a study done on attitudes toward family obligation:
 "Asian and Latin American adolescents possessed stronger values and greater expectations regarding their duty to assist, respect, and support their families than their peers with European backgrounds".

The deeply rooted tradition of duty among both Asian and Latin American cultures contributes to much of the strong sense of duty that exists in comparison to western cultures. Michael Peletz discusses the concept of duty in his book Gender, Sexuality, and Body Politics in Modern Asia:
 "Notions of filial duty … are commonly invoked to mobilize the loyalties, labor power, and other resources children in the ostensible interests of the household and, in some cases, those of the lineage clan as a whole. Doctrines of filial piety … attuned to them may thus be a source of great comfort and solace to the elders but they can also be experienced as stressful, repressive, or both by those who are  enjoined to honor their parents’ (and grandparents’) wishes and unspoken expectations".

An arranged marriage is an example of an expected duty in Asia and the Middle East. In an arranged marriage relating to duty, it is expected that the wife will move in with the husband's family and household to raise their children. Patrilocal residence is usual; rarely does the man move in with the woman, or is the married couple allowed to start their own household and life somewhere else. They need to provide for the entire family in labor and care for the farms and family. Older generations rely heavily on the help from their children's and grandchildren's families. This form of duty is in response to keeping the lineage of a family intact and obliging to the needs of elders.

Criticisms of the concept

Nietzsche 
Friedrich Nietzsche is among the fiercest critics of the concept of duty. "What destroys a man more quickly", he asks, "than to work, think, and feel without inner necessity, without any deep personal desire, without pleasure—as a mere automaton of “duty”?" (The Antichrist, § 11)

Nietzsche claims that the task of all higher education is "to turn men into machines". The way to turn men into machines is to teach them to tolerate boredom. This is accomplished, Nietzsche says, by means of the concept of duty. (Twilight of the Idols, “Skirmishes of an untimely man” § 9.29)

Arthur Schopenhauer's writings, among them On the Basis of Morality, had a profound effect on Nietzsche and led him to a series of inversions to show that morality was not based in "compassion or sympathy" but in life overcoming itself through the will to power. Among these inversions "duty" and "pity," from Immanuel Kant and Schopenhauer respectively.

Ayn Rand 
Ayn Rand, a youthful admirer of Nietzsche, anchored her morality against Kant's notion of duty. "In a deontological theory, all personal desires are banished from the realm of morality; a personal desire has no moral significance, be it a desire to create or a desire to kill. For example, if a man is not supporting his life from duty, such a morality makes no distinction between supporting it by honest labor or by robbery. If a man wants to be honest, he deserves no moral credit; as Kant would put it, such honesty is 'praiseworthy,' but without 'moral import.'"

See also
 Deontological ethics
 Dharma
 Filial piety
 Mitzvah
 Morality

References

External links

 
 Duty and Moral Worth

Contract law
Deontological ethics
Ethical principles
Ethics
Tort law
Virtue